Be What You Are is a soul album by the Staple Singers, released on December 8, 1973. It reached number 13 on the Billboard Top Soul LPs chart. The first single, "Be What You Are", fared poorly; however, the follow-up, "If You're Ready (Come Go with Me)", was a top ten hit, peaking at number nine on the Billboard Hot 100 and number one on the R&B Singles chart. The third single, "Touch a Hand, Make a Friend" charting at number 23 on the Hot 100 and number three on the R&B chart in 1974.

Track listing

Personnel
 Cleotha Staples, Mavis Staples, Yvonne Staples - lead and backing vocals
 Roebuck "Pops" Staples - vocals, guitar

Charts

Singles

References

External links
 The Staple Singers-Be What You Are at Discogs

1973 albums
The Staple Singers albums
Albums produced by Al Bell
Stax Records albums